Henry Hewes (April 9, 1917 – July 18, 2006) was an American theater writer who worked as the drama critic for the Saturday Review weekly literary magazine from 1955 to 1979. He was the first major critic to regularly review regional and international theater. His interest in regional theater led him to found the American Theater Critics Association, the Tony Award for regional theater, and the American Theater Wing's design award, now called the Hewes Award. In 2002, he was inducted into the American Theater Hall of Fame.

Early life and education
Hewes was born in Boston to a socially prominent family, the son of Margaret Gordon (Warman) and Henry Fox Hewes. His mother was a theater producer, and Hewes first became interested in theater at the age of ten. He began studying pre-med at Harvard University, but his studies were interrupted by World War II.

Hewes served in the Army Air Corps during hostilities. After the war, he shifted his focus to theater studies and graduated from Columbia University in 1949.

Career
Hewes' first job in journalism was working as a copy boy at the New York Times. Encouraged by the critic Brooks Atkinson, he began writing arts profiles for the Times' Sunday Magazine.

From the Times, he went to the Saturday Review, a weekly magazine, where he worked as secondary drama critic to John Mason Brown. In 1955, Hewes was made the primary drama critic. He held that position until 1976, and became known for championing new works and playwrights. He was also known for being the first major critic to cover regional and international theater in addition to New York productions. In addition to his drama criticism, Hewes edited the annual Best Plays anthology from 1960-1964, bringing greater attention to new works and playwrights. 

Hewes was primarily a critic and writer, but also did some theater directing. In 1972, he directed Bernie Kahn's Our Very Own Hole in the Ground at La MaMa Experimental Theatre Club in the East Village, Manhattan.

In 1974, Hewes established the American Theater Critics Association, partially due to his interest in regional theater. He also helped to found the Tony Award for regional theater and the American Theater Wing's design award, which is now called the Henry Hewes Design Award.

Personal life 
Hewes married Jane Fowle, with whom he had three sons: Henry, Tucker, and Havelock. Hewes died in Manhattan on July 18, 2006 at the age of 89.

Legacy and honors
Elected president of the New York Drama Critics' Circle and the Drama Desk 
Inducted into the American Theater Hall of Fame (2002)

References

External links
"Henry Hewes", New General Catalog of Old Books and Authors
Hewes' page on La MaMa Archives Digital Collections

1917 births
2006 deaths
American people of Welsh descent
Carnegie Mellon University alumni
Columbia University alumni
Harvard University alumni
Writers from Boston
American theater critics
United States Army Air Forces personnel of World War II